Leandro Fernández may refer to:

Leandro Fernández (historian) (1889–1948), Filipino historian
Leandro Fernández (footballer, born 1983), Argentine footballer
Leandro Fernández (footballer, born 1991), Argentine footballer for Godoy Cruz
Leandro Fernández (footballer, born 1995), Argentine footballer
Leandro Fernández (artist), comic book artist
Leandro Fernández (actor), musician, actor, director
Leandro Fernández de Moratín (1760–1828), Spanish dramatist, translator and neoclassical poet